The Karnataka College of Percussion (KCP) is a music school in Bangalore, Karnataka, India, which is dedicated to the teaching of the Carnatic percussion and vocal music of South India. It was founded in approximately 1964 by the mridangam player T. A. S. Mani.

The college features a percussion ensemble called Tala Tarangini, which has performed throughout Asia, Europe, North America, and Australia, and which has collaborated with numerous jazz rock musicians, including Charlie Mariano, Okay Temiz, Iain Ballamy, Dissidenten, and Embryo.

Discography
 1979/80 Reise Schneeball with Embryo
 1981  Sangam (Eigelstein) with C. Mariano and Louis Banks
 1983  Jyothi with C. Mariano
 1980 Life with Embryo and C. Mariano 
 1982 Germanistan with Dissidenten 
 1983 Germanistan Tour 83 with Dissidenten
 1994 The Jungle Book with Dissidenten 
 1995 Shiva Ganga with Dr. Raghavendra
 1997 Blue Glass  with C. Hinze
 1999 River Yanuma
 2000 Bangalore Wild with David Rothenberg
 2002 The Great Train Journey  with Dr. Ragavendra and C. Mariano
 2005 Om Keshav with C. Mariano
 2013 Yoga Music on Sitar and Veena

External links
Karnataka College of Percussion page
Karnataka College of Percussion page

Video
Karnataka College of Percussion videos

Carnatic music
Music schools in Bangalore
Colleges in Bangalore
Educational institutions established in 1964
Percussion organizations
High schools and secondary schools in Bangalore
1964 establishments in India